The following things have been named after Rajiv Gandhi, who was the Prime Minister of India from 1984 to 1989.  A Right to Information query raised in 2013 was answered saying that over 450 schemes, building, projects, institutions, etc. were named after the three family members (Jawaharlal Nehru, Indira Gandhi and Rajiv Gandhi) of the Nehru–Gandhi family.

Airports 
 Rajiv Gandhi International Airport at Hyderabad, Telangana.

Awards 
 Rajiv Gandhi National Quality Award
 Rajiv Gandhi National Sadbhavana Award

Educational Institutions 
 Assam Rajiv Gandhi University of Cooperative Management, Sivasagar, Assam
 Rajiv Gandhi Science Centre, Mauritius
 Rajeev Gandhi Memorial Boarding School, Sheopur, Madhya Pradesh
 Rajiv Gandhi Academy for Aviation Technology, Trivandrum, Kerala
 Rajiv Gandhi Centre for Biotechnology, Thiruvananthapuram, Kerala.
 Rajiv Gandhi College of Engineering, Sriperumbudur, Tamil Nadu
 Rajiv Gandhi College of Engineering and Technology, Puducherry
 Rajiv Gandhi College of Engineering, Research and Technology, Chandrapur, Maharashtra
 Rajiv Gandhi College of Veterinary and Animal Sciences, Puducherry
 Rajiv Gandhi Degree College, Rajahmundry, Andhra Pradesh
 Rajiv Gandhi Education City, Sonipat, Haryana
 Rajiv Gandhi Foundation, Delhi
 Rajiv Gandhi Government Engineering College Kangra, Himachal Pradesh
 Rajiv Gandhi Government Polytechnic, Itanagar, Arunachal Pradesh
 Rajiv Gandhi Institute of Medical Sciences, Adilabad, Telangana
 Rajiv Gandhi Institute of Medical Sciences, Ongole, Andhra Pradesh
 Rajiv Gandhi Institute of Medical Sciences, Srikakulam, Andhra Pradesh
 Rajiv Gandhi Institute of Petroleum Technology, Rae Bareli, Uttar Pradesh.
 Rajiv Gandhi Institute of Pharmacy, Trikaripur, Kerala
 Rajiv Gandhi Institute of Technology, Kottayam, Kerala
 Rajiv Gandhi Institute of Technology, Mumbai, Maharashtra
 Rajiv Gandhi Medical College, Kalwa, Maharashtra
 Rajiv Gandhi National Aviation University, Raebareli, Uttar Pradesh
 Rajiv Gandhi National Cyber Law Center, Delhi
 Rajiv Gandhi National University of Law, Patiala, Punjab
 Rajiv Gandhi Polytechnic, Kavalkhed, Udgir, Maharashtra
 Rajiv Gandhi Proudyogiki Vishwavidyalaya, Bhopal, Madhya Pradesh
 Rajiv Gandhi School of Intellectual Property Law, Kharagpur
 Rajiv Gandhi Technical University, at Bhopal, Madhya Pradesh.
 Rajiv Gandhi University, Doimukh, Arunachal Pradesh.
 Rajiv Gandhi University of Health Sciences, Bangalore, Karnataka.
 Rajiv Gandhi University of Knowledge Technologies, Basar, Telangana
 Rajiv Gandhi University of Knowledge Technologies, Nuzvid, Andhra Pradesh

Hospitals 
 Rajiv Gandhi Cancer Institute and Research Centre, Delhi
 Rajiv Gandhi Government General Hospital, at Chennai, Tamil Nadu.
 Rajiv Gandhi Government Women And Children's Hospital, Pondicherry
 Rajiv Gandhi Chest Hospital, Bengaluru

Sports Stadiums 
 Rajiv Gandhi Indoor Stadium, Kochi, Ernakulam,  Kerala
 Rajiv Gandhi Stadium, Belapur, Navi Mumbai.

 Rajiv Gandhi International Cricket Stadium, Dehradun, Uttarakhand.
 Rajiv Gandhi International Cricket Stadium, Hyderabad, Telangana.
 Rajiv Gandhi Sports Complex, Rohtak, Haryana
 Rajiv Gandhi Stadium, Aizawl, Mizoram.

Museums 
 Rajiv Gandhi Garden, Udaipur, Rajasthan
 Rajiv Gandhi Regional Museum of Natural History, Sawai Madhopur, Rajasthan
 Rajiv Smruthi Bhavan, Visakhapatnam
 Rajiv Gandhi Wild Life Sanctuary, (Formerly known as Nagarjunasagar - Srisailam Tiger Reserve), Andhra Pradesh

Schemes 
 Rajiv Gandhi Equity Savings Scheme
 Rajiv Yuva Kiranalu
Rajiv Gandhi Panchayat Sashaktikaran Abhiyan
Rajiv Gandhi Grameen Vidyutikaran Yojana

Others
 Rajiv Gandhi Charitable Trust, Delhi
 Rajiv Gandhi Container Terminal, at Kochi, Kerala.
 Rajiv Gandhi Bhawan, Delhi
 Rajiv Gandhi Combined Cycle Power Project, at Alappuzha district, Kerala.
 Rajiv Gandhi Infotech Park, Pune, Maharashtra
 Rajiv Gandhi National Institute of Youth Development, Delhi
 Rajiv Gandhi Memorial, Sriperumbudur, Tamil Nadu
 Rajiv Gandhi Salai, Chennai
 Rajiv Gandhi Setu, Mumbai
 Rajiv Gandhi Thermal Power Station

See also 
 List of things named after B. R. Ambedkar
 List of things named after Jawaharlal Nehru
 List of things named after Mahatma Gandhi

References 

Lists of things named after Indian politicians
Lists relating to prime ministers of India